Allentown Central Catholic High School (ACCHS) is a private, parochial school located at 301 North Fourth Street in Allentown, Pennsylvania.  Located in the Roman Catholic Diocese of Allentown, ACCHS predominantly serves students from the Lehigh Valley region of the state.

As of the 2020–21 school year, Allentown Central Catholic had a student enrollment of 650 students and 43.8 classroom teachers (on an FTE basis) for a student–teacher ratio of 14.8, according to National Center for Education Statistics data. There were 587 students eligible for free lunch and 88 eligible for reduced-cost lunch.

History
The school was founded as Masson Memorial School in 1926 by the Rt. Rev. Leo Gregory Fink, then rector of Sacred Heart Parish. The school was named in honor of Msgr. Peter Masson, Fink's predecessor at Sacred Heart. The cornerstone of the new school's first new building was laid in March 1927. This building, now known as Masson Hall, was constructed on the corner of Fourth and Chew Streets in Allentown.

As the school grew, new buildings were added. Rockne Hall, the school's indoor sports gymnasium, was constructed in 1940 and named in honor of former Notre Dame football coach Knute Rockne. Commodore Barry Hall, named after American Revolutionary War naval hero Commodore John Barry, was built in 1964. Other buildings, including parts of the Sacred Heart School building, were used by the school during the second half of the 20th century.

Academics
Allentown Central Catholic High School is a multiple Blue Ribbon Award-winning school of excellence.

Athletics

Allentown Central Catholic competes athletically in the Eastern Pennsylvania Conference (EPC) in the District XI division of the Pennsylvania Interscholastic Athletic Association (PIAA), one of the premier high school athletic divisions in the nation.  Previously, from 2002 to 2014, the school competed in the Lehigh Valley Conference. It holds the fourth most Lehigh Valley Conference championships in all sports, behind Parkland High School, Emmaus High School and Easton Area High School. Central Catholic holds the record for the most Lehigh Valley Conference championships in girls basketball, girls cross country, and girls volleyball.

Stadium and arena
CCHS plays its home football and some of its soccer games at J. Birney Crum Stadium, a 15,000 capacity stadium and the second largest high school stadium in Pennsylvania, located on Linden Street between 20th and 22nd streets in Allentown.

The school plays the majority of its indoor sporting events, including basketball and wrestling, in Rockne Hall, the school's historic indoor sporting facility, which was named in 1941 for former Notre Dame head football coach Knute Rockne, whose life was cut short at 43 in a 1931 plane crash.

Boys lacrosse
The CCHS boys lacrosse team won the PIAA 2A State Championship in 2021.

Football
The CCHS football team has won three PIAA state championships, in 1993, 1998, and 2010.

Girls basketball
The CCHS girls basketball team has won seven PIAA state championships, in 1973, 1978, 1987, and four in a row from 2001 through 2004. The boys basketball team has won three PIAA state championships, in 1984, 1986, and 2021.

Girls volleyball and cross country
n 2001–2002, both the girls volleyball and girls cross country running teams were Pennsylvania state champions. Additionally, in 2007, 2008, and 2016 the girls volleyball team won the AAA state championship.

Ice hockey
CCHS is one of eleven Lehigh Valley-area high schools with an ice hockey team; the team is a member of the Lehigh Valley Scholastic Ice Hockey League.

Notable alumni
Muhammad-Ali Abdur-Rahkman, professional basketball player, U.S. Victoria Libertas Pallacanestro
Lillian Briggs, former female rock musician billed in the 1950s as "The Queen of Rock and Roll"
Walt Groller, Grammy-nominated polka musician
Tim Heidecker, comedian, writer, director, actor, and musician, Bridesmaids, Vacation (2015), Ant-Man and the Wasp
Jim Honochick, former Major League Baseball umpire
George Kinek, former professional football player, Chicago Cardinals
Gina Lewandowski, former professional women's soccer player, NJ/NY Gotham FC
Patrick Maggitti, first provost of Villanova University and former dean of the Villanova School of Business
Meredith Marakovits, New York Yankees reporter, YES Network
Michelle M. Marciniak, former women's basketball coach, South Carolina Gamecocks women's basketball, and former professional basketball player, WNBA's Portland Fire and Seattle Storm
Karen Marrongelle, chief operating officer, National Science Foundation, and former dean, Portland State University
Billy McCaffrey, former college basketball coach, St. Bonaventure University
Ed McCaffrey, former professional football player, New York Giants, San Francisco 49ers and Denver Broncos
Joe McHugh, former WWE professional wrestling announcer
Andrew Pataki, former Eastern Catholic hierarch, second bishop of Parma for the Byzantines, and the third bishop of Passaic for the Byzantines
Tony Stewart, former professional football player, Cincinnati Bengals, Oakland Raiders, and Philadelphia Eagles
Christine Taylor, actress and wife of actor Ben Stiller
Stephanie Woodling, opera singer, Deutsche Oper am Rhein

Notable faculty
John Birmelin, Pennsylvania German poet and playwright
Joe Bottiglieri, collegiate football coach, Wesley University of Science and Technology
Leo Crowe, former professional basketball player, Indianapolis Kautskys
James McConlogue, former head football coach, Lafayette College

References

External links

Official website
Allentown Central Catholic High School athletics
Allentown Central Catholic High School on Facebook
Allentown Central Catholic High School on Twitter
Allentown Central Catholic High School athletics on Twitter
Allentown Central Catholic High School profile at Niche
Allentown Central Catholic High School sports coverage at The Express-Times

1926 establishments in Pennsylvania
Catholic secondary schools in Pennsylvania
Educational institutions established in 1926
Private high schools in the Lehigh Valley
Roman Catholic Diocese of Allentown
Schools in Allentown, Pennsylvania